In enzymology, an inositol-pentakisphosphate 2-kinase is an enzyme that catalyzes the chemical reaction

ATP + 1D-myo-inositol 1,3,4,5,6-pentakisphosphate  ADP + 1D-myo-inositol hexakisphosphate

Thus, the two substrates of this enzyme are ATP and 1D-myo-inositol 1,3,4,5,6-pentakisphosphate, whereas its two products are ADP and 1D-myo-inositol hexakisphosphate.

This enzyme belongs to the family of transferases, specifically those transferring phosphorus-containing groups (phosphotransferases) with an alcohol group as acceptor.  The systematic name of this enzyme class is ATP:1D-myo-inositol 1,3,4,5,6-pentakisphosphate 2-phosphotransferase. Other names in common use include IP5 2-kinase, Gsl1p, Ipk1p, inositol polyphosphate kinase, inositol 1,3,4,5,6-pentakisphosphate 2-kinase, and Ins(1,3,4,5,6)P5 2-kinase.

References

 
 
 
 
 
 

EC 2.7.1
Enzymes of unknown structure